Exit is the sixteenth major release and eleventh studio album by the German group Tangerine Dream. The first track features an uncredited Berlin actress chanting, in Russian, the names of the continents of the world and pleading to end the threat of "limited" nuclear war, which was a potential danger facing the world during the late Cold War era in which the album was released. Exit reached № 43 in the UK, spending five weeks on the chart.

Use in other media
The track "Choronzon" is used as the title theme for the Hungarian political TV show, Panoráma. "Network 23" was used in the early 1980s by the TVA network in Montreal (Canada) to promote their news service.  "Remote Viewing" appears in the 2008 video game, Grand Theft Auto IV, featured on the ambient radio station The Journey. The title track is featured in the sixth episode "The Monster" of the Netflix series Stranger Things, and a remixed excerpt, entitled "No Future (Get Off the Babysitter)" was featured on the 1984 soundtrack album for the film Risky Business.

Track listing

Personnel
 Edgar Froese – composer, musician, producer
 Christopher Franke – composer, musician, producer
 Johannes Schmoelling – composer, musician
 Monica Froese – album cover

Singles
 "Choronzon / Network 23"

References

External links 
 Tangerine Dream - Exit (1981) album releases & credits at Discogs
 Tangerine Dream - Exit (1981) album to be listened on Spotify
 Tangerine Dream - Exit (1981) album to be listened on YouTube

1981 albums
Tangerine Dream albums
Virgin Records albums